Jesús David Delgado Pérez (born 17 June 1999) is a Spanish atlhete specialising in the 400 metres hurdles. He won a bronze medal at the 2022 Ibero-American Championships.

International competitions

Personal bests
Outdoor
400 metres – 48.08 (Nerja 2022)
400 metres hurdles – 49.53 (Huelva 2021)
Indoor
400 metres – 47.83 (Salamanca 2020)

References

1999 births
Living people
Spanish male hurdlers
Sportspeople from Las Palmas